Bob Richter (born July 9, 1970) is an American interior designer, author and TV personality. Richter is known for his starring role in the PBS series Market Warriors. He is also the author of A Very Vintage Christmas, and Vintage Living, and A Very Vintage Holiday. Bob is regularly featured on outlets like Good Morning America, TODAY, CBS News, Hallmark Channel, The New York Times, Parade Magazine, The Huffington Post, and Entertainment Weekly.

Bob embraces "stuff" while at the same time emphasizing comfort and smart design. As the host of Minute MakeOver, Bob transforms rooms with quick fixes that make a significant and functional impact. Known as America’s Vintage Lifestyle Expert, Richter is also a contributor to Guideposts where he shares his spiritual take on holiday decorating and living the vintage way.

Profiled several times on HGTV’s Design Happens, Bob encourages homeowners to take risks, experiment with color, and "go with their gut" when it comes to what they love. Whenever possible, Bob uses antiques and reclaimed items in all of his design projects.  Bob’s tongue-in-cheek mantra, “More is more” speaks to his love of art and antiques and is a nod to his design hero Tony Duquette.

A regular contributor to the Home, Style, Arts and Travel Sections of The Huffington Post, Bob creates editorial and video content about antiques, art, flea markets, books and world travel. Popular shopping site One Kings Lane also features Bob as a TasteMaker.

Biography 
Born and raised in Allentown, Pennsylvania, Bob grew up in the family interior design business. It ensured he always had summer employment, and set the stage for Bob's appreciation of textile and color. Heading up the family business, Bob's Grandmother trained his eye and helped to form his aesthetic at a very early age. Until her death at age 97, Bob's grandmother continued to be a touchstone for him, and he still considers her one of his greatest sources of inspiration.

Bob studied at NYU, where he earned his BA in Communication, and then his MA in Education. While studying at NYU, Bob also worked for an antiques dealer, acquiring knowledge in the area of art and antiques in addition to his formal education.

Bob then began a career in public relations, eventually launching his own firm, Richter Media. In addition to running it, Bob continued to keep his passion for design at the forefront of his life, frequenting auctions, flea markets and thrift shops. Organically over time, Bob began to apply his expertise to interior design jobs with the launch of Richter Design.

Bob's recent design projects have ranged from a Texas ranch to a Mid-Century Pennsylvania country home, to a NYC brownstone.

An avid collector of antique Christmas ornaments and a self-proclaimed "Christmas Fanatic", Bob was, in December 2010, featured in a front-page story of The New York Times Home Section, alongside famed Designers Mary McDonald and Vern Yip.

Bob has been featured as an expert Martha Stewart Living Radio’s Home Design program on Sirius XM Radio, as an expert on flea markets, auctions, and tag sales; the program is hosted by Kevin Sharkey, Martha Stewart Living Omnimedia's ExecutiveVice President and Executive  Director of Design, often described as Stewart's right-hand man.

On the charitable front, Bob is a supporter of Housing Works, for whom he's designed rooms, and in return, raised money for their cause at the annual event, Design on a Dime. In the years that Bob has been a featured designer, he's worked alongside television personalities including Ty Pennington, Jaclyn Smith, Charlotte Moss and Miles Redd.

In addition to his other endeavors, Bob also teaches Undergraduates at NYU, and works as a voice-over artist.  Bob's voice has most recently been behind such brands as Comcast, Carrabba's Italian Grill, Chase and Labatt Blue. Bob's voice was also used in the 2013 feature film Bert and Arnie's Guide to Friendship.

References

External links 
 http://www.richtermedia.com/
 http://www.richterdesign.net/
https://www.averyvintagechristmas.com/
 https://web.archive.org/web/20110625140340/http://richterdesign.net/blog/
 http://shelterpop.search.aol.com/search?page=1&q=bob+richter&oreq=b94da14ff66649f3843a29b97ab29cf8&s_it=header_form&nt=SG3
Market Warriors’ Bob Richter on Antiques Picking in NYC and on the Road

1970 births
Living people
American interior designers
Steinhardt School of Culture, Education, and Human Development alumni